Janet Ada Rosalie Sheather (1912 – 11 September 1945) was a Canadian swimmer. She competed in the women's 200 metre breaststroke at the 1932 Summer Olympics.

Sheather committed suicide by shooting herself in 1945.

References

External links
 

1912 births
1945 deaths
1945 suicides
Canadian female swimmers
Olympic swimmers of Canada
Swimmers at the 1932 Summer Olympics
Swimmers from Mississauga
Suicides by firearm in Ontario
20th-century Canadian women